Jordan Palin (born 19 February 2004) is an English speedway rider.

Career
Palin began his British career riding for the Belle Vue Colts in 2019. He rode in the top tier of British Speedway, for the Peterborough Panthers in the SGB Premiership 2021, in addition to the Scunthorpe Scorpions in the SGB Championship 2021. 

The following season he remained with both clubs, riding for the Peterborough in the SGB Premiership 2022 and for the Scunthorpe in the SGB Championship 2022. His 2022 season came to an end following a crash at Belle Vue and he missed the entire 2023 season due to a bleed on the brain suffered during the accident.

References 

2004 births
Living people
British speedway riders
Belle Vue Colts riders
Peterborough Panthers riders
Scunthorpe Scorpions riders